Maria Anna Marzia (called Marietta) Alboni (6 March 1826 – 23 June 1894) was a renowned Italian contralto opera singer. She is considered "one of the greatest contraltos in operatic history".

Biography
Alboni was born at Città di Castello, in Umbria. Rossini tested the humble thirteen-year-old girl himself, had her admitted to the school with special treatment, and even procured her an early engagement to tour his Stabat Mater around Northern Italy, so that she could pay for her studies. After she achieved her diploma and made a modest debut in Bologna, in 1842, as "Climene" in Pacini's Saffo, she obtained a triennial engagement thanks to Rossini's influence on the impresario Bartolomeo Merelli, Intendant at both Milan's Teatro alla Scala and Vienna's Imperial Kärntnertortheater. The favourable contract was signed by Rossini himself, "on behalf of Eustachio Alboni", father of Marietta, who was still a minor. The singer remained, throughout her life, deeply grateful to her ancient "maestro", nearly a second father to her.

Her debut at Teatro alla Scala took place in December 1842 as "Neocle" in the Italian version of Le siège de Corinthe, which was followed by roles in operas by Marliani, Donizetti (as "Maffio Orsini" and "Leonora" in the Scala premiere of an Italian version of La favorite), Salvi and Pacini. In the season 1844–1845 she was engaged in the Saint Petersburg Imperial Bolshoi Kamenny Theatre; later, in 1846–47, she toured the principal cities of Central Europe, finally reaching London and Paris, where she settled permanently. In London, "she appeared in leading roles by Rossini and Donizetti (where she outshone Giulia Grisi and Jenny Lind) and also sang Cherubino (performing with Henriette Sontag)". For the 1848 London run of Les Huguenots, Meyerbeer transposed the role of the page "Urbain" 'from soprano to contralto and composed the aria "Non! – non, non, non, non, non! Vous n'avez jamais, je gage"  in Act 2' for her. On 28 August 1848, she sang at a concert in Manchester's Concert Hall, sharing the stage with Lorenzo Salvi and Frédéric Chopin. She toured the United States in 1852–53, appearing there with Camilla Urso.

In 1853 she wed a nobleman, Count Carlo Pepoli, of the Papal States, but she kept her maiden name for the stage. In 1863 she had to retire the first time on account of her husband's serious mental illness. He died in 1867. A year later, in 1868, Alboni would take part in the funeral of her beloved master and friend, Rossini, in the Église de la Sainte-Trinité. There she sang, alongside Adelina Patti, the leading soprano of the time, a stanza of Dies irae, "Liber scriptum", adjusted to the music of the duet "Quis est Homo" from Rossini's own Stabat Mater. Out of deference to her master, she also accepted to resume her singing career mainly in order to tour the orchestral version of the Petite messe solennelle around Europe. Rossini had once expressed his hope that she would take upon herself to perform it when he was dead. He had said that he had composed it, and especially the new section "O salutaris", just having her voice in mind.

In 1872 she permanently retired from the stage with four performances of "Fidalma" in Cimarosa's Il matrimonio segreto, at the Paris Théâtre des Italiens but, in fact, she never gave up singing in private and in benefit concerts. When in 1887 the French and Italian Governments agreed upon moving the mortal remains of Rossini into the Basilica di Santa Croce in Florence, Alboni, then a sixty-one-year-old lady living in seclusion, wrote to the Italian Foreign Minister, Di Robilant, proposing that the Petite Messe Solennelle, "the last musical composition by Rossini", be performed in Santa Croce the day of the funeral, and "demanding the honour, as an Italian and a pupil of the immortal Maestro," of singing it herself in her "dear and beloved homeland". Her wish, however, never came true and she was just given the chance of being present at the exhumation ceremony in Paris. The Paris correspondent of the Rome newspaper Il Fanfulla wrote on the occasion: "photographers snapped in the same shot the greatest performer of Cenerentola and Semiramide, and what is left of the man who wrote these masterpieces".

In 1877 she had remarried—to a French military officer named Charles Zieger. She died at Ville-d'Avray, near Paris, in her "Villa La Cenerentola", and was buried at Père Lachaise Cemetery. Always engaged in charity (often in memory of Maestro Rossini), she left nearly all her estate to the poor of Paris. In her will she wrote that by singing she had earned all her fortune, and on singing she would pass away, with the sweet thought that she had employed it to encourage and to console.

Artistic features
Alboni's voice, an exceptionally fine contralto with a seamless compass of two and one-half octaves, extending as high as the soprano range was said to possess at once power, sweetness, fullness, and extraordinary flexibility. She had no peers in passages requiring a sensitive delivery and semi-religious calmness, owing to the moving quality of her velvety tone. She possessed vivacity, grace, and charm as an actress of the comédienne type; but she was not a natural tragédienne, and her attempt at the strongly dramatic part of Norma was sometimes reported to have turned out a failure. Nevertheless, she scored a real triumph in 1850, when she made her operatic debut at the Paris Opéra performing the tragic role of "Fidès" in Meyerbeer's Le prophète, which had been created the year before by no less than Pauline Viardot. Furthermore, she was able to cope with such dramatic roles as "Azucena" and "Ulrica" in Verdi's Il trovatore and Un ballo in maschera, and even with the baritone role of "Don Carlo" in Ernani (London, 1847).

Repertoire

The following list of the roles performed by Marietta Alboni was drawn up by Arthur Pougin and published in his biography of the singer. It is reported here with the addition of further works and characters according to the sources stated in footnotes. 
 Anna Bolena, by Donizetti – Anna and Smeton
 L'assedio di Corinto, by Rossini – Neocle
 Un ballo in maschera, by Verdi – Ulrica
 Il barbiere di Siviglia, by Rossini – Rosina
 La Cenerentola, by Rossini – Cenerentola
 Charles VI, by Halévy – Odette
 Consuelo, by Giovanni Battista Gordigiani – Anzoletto
 Così fan tutte, by Mozart – Dorabella
 Il crociato, by Meyerbeer – Felicia
 Un curioso accidente, pastiche with music by Rossini
 David, oratorio, by Muhlig
 Don Giovanni, by Mozart – Zerlina
 Don Pasquale, by Donizetti – Norina
 La donna del lago, by Rossini – Malcolm and Elena
 L'ebrea, by Pacini – Berenice
 Ernani, by Verdi – Don Carlo, Giovanna
 La favorite, by Donizetti – Léonor
 La fille du régiment, by Donizetti – Marie
 La gazza ladra, by Rossini – Pippo and Ninetta
 , cantata, by Rossini
 Giulietta e Romeo, by Vaccai – Romeo
 Il giuramento, by Mercadante – Bianca
 Ildegonda, by Marco Aurelio Marliani – Rizzardo
 L'italiana in Algeri, by Rossini – Isabella
 Lara, by Salvi – Mirza
 Linda di Chamounix, by Donizetti – Pierotto
 Lucrezia Borgia, by Donizetti – Maffio Orsini
 Luisa Miller, by Verdi – Federica
 Maria di Rohan, by Donizetti – Gondi
 Martha, by Flotow – Nancy
 Il matrimonio segreto, by Cimarosa – Fidalma
 Messiah, oratorio by Händel
 La pazza per amore, by Coppola – Nina
 Norma, by Bellini – Norma
 Le nozze di Figaro, by Mozart – The page (Cherubino)
 Oberon, by Weber – Fatima
 Petite messe solennelle, mass by Rossini
 Le prophète, by Meyerbeer – Fidès
 La reine de Chypre, by Halévy – Catarina
 Rigoletto, by Verdi – Maddalena
 Saffo, by Pacini – Climene
 Semiramide, by Rossini – Arsace
 La sibilla, by Pietro Torrigiani – Ismailia
 La sonnambula, by Bellini – Amina
 Stabat mater, Marian hymn, by Rossini
 Tancredi, by Rossini – Tancredi
 Il trovatore, by Verdi – Azucena
 Zerline, by Auber – Zerline
 La zingara, by Balfe – Queen of the Gypsies
 Les Huguenots, by Meyerbeer – The page (Urbain)

References
Notes

Sources
  Rodolfo Celletti, La grana della voce. Opere, direttori e cantanti, 2nd edition (Milano, 2000). 
 Henry Fothergill Chorley (1862), Thirty Years' Musical Recollections. Hurst & Blackett, London, Volume II, The Year 1847, 8–13.
 Galliano Ciliberti, "Alboni, Marietta", in S. Sadie, cited, I, p. 59
 F. M. Colby and T. Williams (Eds.) (1917–1926), New International Encyclopedia (2nd Edition). Dodd, Mead & Co., The University Press, Cambridge Massachusetts.
 G. T. Ferris, Great Singers (New York, 1893)
  Arthur Pougin, Marietta Alboni (Paris, 1912; accessible for free online at gallica.bnf.fr Gallica – Bibliothèque nationale de France)
  Arthur Pougin, Marietta Alboni (Cesena, 2001) (translated into Italian by Michele Massarelli with additions to the original text by Lelio Burgini). 
 Sadie, Stanley (ed.), The New Grove Dictionary of Opera, Grove (Oxford University Press), New York, 1997.

External links

www.coroalboni.it
www.coralealboni.com
Coro Lirico Città di Cesena (Italian)

Operatic contraltos
Italian contraltos
Italian opera singers
1823 births
1894 deaths
Burials at Père Lachaise Cemetery
People from Città di Castello
19th-century Italian singers
19th-century Italian women singers
Conservatorio Giovanni Battista Martini alumni